SSPS or SSpS or 'ssps' may refer to:

 Satellite Systems and Procedures
 Missionary Sisters Servants of the Holy Spirit
 Smichov secondary technical school
 Stuart Scott Public School
 Shared Socioeconomic Pathways (SSPs)
 Sheffield Sawmakers' Protection Society, a former trade union in England
 Single Sound Per Symbol, a phonetic alphabet